Theresa LePore is a former Supervisor of Elections for Palm Beach County, Florida.  She designed the infamous "butterfly ballot" used in the 2000 presidential election. This would lead the press to nickname her "Madame Butterfly".  Following the controversial results of the 2000 election, she lost her re-election bid in September 2004 and left office in January 2005.

Career
LePore grew up in Palm Beach County, attending Cardinal Newman High School in West Palm Beach, Palm Beach State College in Lake Worth and Florida Atlantic University in Boca Raton.

She started her career in the Supervisor of Elections Office in 1971 as a file clerk.  She quickly rose through the ranks and achieved the position of Chief Deputy Supervisor in the late 1970s.  During the 1980s she also moonlighted as a ramp clerk at Palm Beach International Airport.

In 1996 LePore changed her political party registration to Democratic after deciding to run for the position of Supervisor of Elections. She was elected as the Palm Beach County Supervisor of Elections in November, 1996 and re-elected without opposition in November, 2000. In 2004 she lost re-election as Election Supervisor. Prior to the election she had changed her political party designation to independent. After leaving the Supervisor of Elections Office in January, 2005, she was employed by the Palm Beach County State Attorney's Office for a short period, enabling her to receive her full pension from Palm Beach County.

She then worked at her alma mater, Cardinal Newman High School in West Palm Beach, Florida as director of development. until January 2009.

LePore is (or was) a member of the following organizations:
 American Society of Public Administration
 The Election Center
 Kiwanis of Flagler Sunrise
 League of Women Voters
 International Association of Clerks, Recorders, Election Officials and Treasurers
 Women's Chamber of Commerce of the Palm Beaches
 Florida State Association of Supervisors of Election. Theresa served terms as Secretary, Vice-President, and President of FSASE.
 Executive Women of the Palm Beaches
 The Hispanic Chamber of Commerce of PBC
 Hispanic Human Resources Council
 Girl Scouts of Southeast Florida

She is writing a book about the 2000 election and the butterfly ballot she designed.

Election controversy
In 2000, to accommodate the large number of presidential candidates eligible in Florida, LePore designed a staggered two-page format with candidate names on alternating sides of a central punch button column. Conservatives falsely commented that the same ballot was successfully used in the 1996 election; in fact, it had never been used in a Palm Beach County election among rival candidates for office. In 2000, the confusing design led to an increased number of miscast votes in the presidential election (votes that would otherwise have been a decisive reversal) and consequently achieved notoriety. 

A study by The Palm Beach Post speculated that voters confused by Palm Beach County's butterfly ballot cost Al Gore the presidency.

Popular culture
In Jay Roach's Recount, LePore is played by Jayne Atkinson.

References

County officials in Florida
Year of birth missing (living people)
Living people
Florida Atlantic University alumni
People from Palm Beach County, Florida
People associated with the 2000 United States presidential election
2000 United States presidential election in Florida
Women in Florida politics
21st-century American women politicians
20th-century American women politicians
20th-century American politicians
21st-century American politicians
Florida Democrats